In Trance  is the third studio album by German rock band Scorpions and it was released by RCA Records in 1975. The music was a complete departure from the progressive krautrock of the two previous albums. Instead, a hard rock sound of shorter and tighter arrangements with which the band would achieve their later global success and fame emerged. Extended suites in the vein of songs such as "Lonesome Crow" and "Fly to the Rainbow" are absent altogether. This was the first of two studio albums to feature drummer Rudy Lenners, and the first album by the band to contain the now-famous logo and controversial artwork.

Artwork
The original version of the album cover--photographed by Michael von Gimbut was censored for clearly showing the cover model's exposed breast hanging down towards the guitar. Later releases blacked out the breast so that it is not visible. This is the first of many Scorpions album covers to have been censored. The band's former lead guitarist Uli Jon Roth claimed he may have "come up with the idea to do the thing with the guitar for the cover of In Trance".

However, in a 2008 interview Roth claimed that early Scorpions album covers in general were "the record company's idea-- but we certainly didn't object. And so shame on us. Those covers were probably the most embarrassing thing I've ever been involved with." He did, though, classify the In Trance cover as "borderline".

The White Stratocaster shown on the cover belonged to Roth and he can be seen playing the same guitar on the cover of the Electric Sun album Fire Wind. This is the guitar that Roth used on all subsequent Scorpions and Electric Sun albums on which he played.

This was the band's first album to feature the band's name written in the now-familiar font used on nearly all subsequent album covers--as well as their first collaboration with producer Dieter Dierks.

Track listing

Personnel
Scorpions
 Klaus Meine – lead vocals, co-lead vocals on "Dark Lady" (chorus)
 Ulrich Roth – lead guitar, lead vocals on "Dark Lady" and "Sun in My Hand"
 Rudolf Schenker – rhythm guitar, backing vocals
 Francis Buchholz – bass, backing vocals
 Rudy Lenners – drums

Additional musician
 Achim Kirschning – keyboards

Production
 Dieter Dierks – producer, engineer, mixing

References

External links
In Trance at the-scorpions.com

1975 albums
Scorpions (band) albums
RCA Records albums
Albums produced by Dieter Dierks